Timonium  is a census-designated place (CDP) in Baltimore County, Maryland, United States. As of the 2010 census it had a population of 9,926. Prior to 2010 the area was part of the Lutherville-Timonium CDP. The Maryland State Fair is held in Timonium each year near Labor Day on the grounds of the former Timonium Race Course, which is an important site along with Pimlico Race Course in northwest Baltimore and Laurel Park in Prince George's County, along with other former tracks at Bowie and Rosecroft in Maryland thoroughbred horse racing traditions.

Etymology
Timonium takes its name from the Timonium Mansion, the home of Mrs. Archibald Buchanan, who, in melancholia due to the loss of eyesight and the death of a close friend, felt her life was like that of Mark Antony after the Battle of Actium. The original Timonium was an incomplete palace Mark Antony built on the island of Antirhodos in the harbor of Alexandria, Egypt. Antony died by suicide at the palace after receiving a false report that Cleopatra had died by suicide.

Geography
Timonium is at  (39.4441, −76.6076).

The town is north of Baltimore City along York Road (Maryland Route 45). It is bordered on the north by Cockeysville, on the south by Lutherville, on the east by Loch Raven Reservoir, and on the west by Falls Road (Maryland Route 25), with the Greenspring and Worthington Valleys beyond. Ridgely Road forms the boundary between Timonium and Lutherville, while Padonia Road separates Timonium from Cockeysville.

Timonium is in the Piedmont region of the United States, and is in the transition zone between the Humid subtropical climate zone to the south and the humid continental climate to the north, with hot and humid summers leading into winters that are cold but not extreme by American standards.

Demographics

Transportation

Roads
Major roads in the Timonium area include:
Deereco Road/Greenspring Drive
Dulaney Valley Road (MD-146)
Pot Spring Road
Timonium Road
York Road (MD-45)
Padonia Road
Ridgely Road
Mays Chapel Road
Eastridge Road

Public transportation
The Maryland Transit Administration's light rail line has two stops in the Timonium area: Timonium Business Park and Timonium. In addition, bus routes 8 and 9 provide regular service along the York Road corridor.

Notable people
 Spiro T. Agnew, former U.S. Vice President and Governor of Maryland (plus Baltimore County Executive), buried in Timonium
 Mark Belanger (1944-1998), Baltimore Orioles shortstop
 Helen Bentley, politician
 William C. Bilo, United States Army brigadier general and deputy director of the Army National Guard
 Grafton Marsh Bosley (1825–1901), physician, philanthropist, planner, politician, and co-founder of the Maryland State Fair.
 Beth Botsford, swimmer
 Robert Ehrlich, 60th Governor of Maryland. He was a resident of Timonium while serving in Congress as a Representative in the House of Representatives (although raised in Arbutus which he often cited). 
 Jim Gentile, former Baltimore Orioles first baseman.
Rob Hiaasen, journalist and editor who was killed in the Capital Gazette shooting.
 Pam Shriver, tennis player.
 Don Shula, former Baltimore Colts player and coach in the 1960s, later famous coach of the Miami Dolphins, undefeated champions in 1972 in the National Football League, member of the Pro Football Hall of Fame.
 Dick Szymanski, former Baltimore Colts player.
 Gus Triandos (1930-2013), Baltimore Orioles catcher in the 1950s; Triandos Drive is named in honor of him.
 Johnny Unitas, former Baltimore Colt quarterback and Hall of Famer in the National Football League; buried at Dulaney Valley Memorial Gardens.
 Cheryl Wheeler, folk singer.

Education
Public schools
 Pinewood Elementary School
 Pot Spring Elementary School
 Timonium Elementary School
 Ridgely Middle School (in Lutherville)
 Dulaney High School

References

 
Census-designated places in Baltimore County, Maryland
Census-designated places in Maryland